The 2017–18 Los Angeles Kings season was the 51st season (50th season of play) for the National Hockey League franchise that was established on June 5, 1967. The Kings made the playoffs, but were swept by the Vegas Golden Knights in the First Round.

Standings

Schedule and results

Preseason
The Kings announced their preseason schedule on June 15, 2017.

Regular season
The team's regular season schedule was released on June 22, 2017.

Playoffs

Player statistics
Final Stats

Skaters

Goaltenders

†Denotes player spent time with another team before joining the Kings. Stats reflect time with the Kings only.
‡Traded mid-season. Stats reflect time with the Kings only.
Bold/italics denotes franchise record

Transactions
The Kings have been involved in the following transactions during the 2017–18 season.

Trades

Notes:
  Arizona to retain 15% of salary as part of trade.

Free agents acquired

Free agents lost

Claimed via waivers

Lost via waivers

Players released

Lost via retirement

Player signings

Draft picks

Below are the Los Angeles Kings' selections at the 2017 NHL Entry Draft, which was held on June 23 and 24, 2017 at the United Center in Chicago.

Notes:
 The Montreal Canadiens' fourth-round pick went to the Los Angeles Kings as the result of a trade on May 9, 2017 that sent Ben Bishop to Dallas in exchange for this pick.
 The Tampa Bay Lightning's fifth-round pick went to the Los Angeles Kings as the result of a trade on February 26, 2017 that sent Peter Budaj, Erik Cernak, a conditional pick in 2017 and a seventh-round pick in 2017 in exchange for Ben Bishop and this pick.

References

Los Angeles Kings seasons
Los Angeles Kings
Los Angeles Kings
Los Angeles Kings
Kings
Kings